Defending champion Steffi Graf defeated Arantxa Sánchez Vicario in a rematch of the previous year's final, 6–3, 6–7(4–7), 10–8 to win the women's singles tennis title at the 1996 French Open. With the win, Graf claimed her 19th major singles title, surpassing Chris Evert and Martina Navratilova's Open Era record.

Seeds
The seeded players are listed below. Steffi Graf is the champion; others show the round in which they were eliminated.

  Steffi Graf (champion)
  Monica Seles (quarterfinals)
  Conchita Martínez (semifinals)
  Arantxa Sánchez Vicario (final)
  Iva Majoli (quarterfinals)
  Anke Huber (fourth round)
  Kimiko Date (fourth round)
  Brenda Schultz-McCarthy (third round)
  Lindsay Davenport (quarterfinals)
  Jana Novotná (semifinals)
  Mary Joe Fernández (fourth round)
  Mary Pierce (third round)
  Magdalena Maleeva (fourth round)
  Amanda Coetzer (fourth round)
  Martina Hingis (third round)
  Barbara Paulus (third round)

Qualifying

Draw

Finals

Earlier rounds

Section 1

Section 2

Section 3

Section 4

Section 5

Section 6

Section 7

Section 8

External links
1996 French Open – Women's draws and results at the International Tennis Federation

Women's Singles
French Open by year – Women's singles
French Open - Women's Singles
1996 in women's tennis
1996 in French women's sport